Erythronium, the fawn lily, trout lily, dog's-tooth violet or adder's tongue, is a genus of Eurasian and North American plants in the lily family, most closely related to tulips. The name Erythronium derives from Ancient Greek  "red" in Greek, referring to the red flowers of E. dens-canis. Of all the established species, most live in North America; only six species are found in Europe and Asia.

Species 
Erythronium includes about 20–30 species of hardy spring-flowering perennial plants with long, tooth-like bulbs. Slender stems carry pendent flowers with recurved tepals in shades of cream, yellow, pink and mauve. Species are native to forests and meadows in temperate regions of the Northern Hemisphere.

Formerly included 
Two species names were coined using the name Erythronium but have since been reclassified to other taxa.
 Erythronium carolinianum, now called Uvularia perfoliata
 Erythronium hyacinthoides, now called Drimia indica

Cultivation and uses 
Erythroniums are widely grown as ornamental plants, with numerous hybrids and cultivars having been selected for garden use. Popular cultivars include Erythronium 'Pagoda', E. 'Sundisc', E. 'Joanna', E. 'Kondo', E. 'Citronella', E. californicum 'White Beauty', and E. 'Rosalind'. Propagation is best by seed in autumn or by division of bulbs, depending on species. Some species propagate vegetatively. The plant is also great as a ground cover, as it will spread over several years.

The following cultivars, of mixed ancestry, have won the Royal Horticultural Society's Award of Garden Merit:
'Apple Blossom'  (white with yellow centre)
'Janice'  (pink)
'Joanna'  (cream/pale yellow throat)
'Pagoda'  (cream yellow) 
'Sundisc' (yellow)
'Wildside Seedling'  (white/yellow)
The bulb is edible as a root vegetable, cooked or dried, and can be ground into flour.  The leaves can also be cooked as a leaf vegetable. In Japan, Erythronium japonicum is called katakuri, and the bulb is processed to produce starch, which is used for food and other purposes.

See also

 List of plants known as lily

References

Bibliography 

 

 
Liliaceae genera
Root vegetables